Jennifer Helene Maxwell (September 3, 1941 – June 10, 1981) was an American film and television actress, probably best remembered for her role in the 1961 Elvis Presley film Blue Hawaii.

Early years
Maxwell was the daughter of a construction worker of Norwegian descent (the original name of Moksvold was changed when the family emigrated in 1949), and a distant relative of Marilyn Monroe.

Film and television
Vincente Minnelli saw Maxwell when she was 16 years old and a high school student in Brooklyn. He had her do a screen test to possibly portray Frank Sinatra's niece in Some Came Running.

Maxwell played spoiled Ellie Corbett in Blue Hawaii, whom Elvis' character eventually tames by spanking her on the beach. She also appeared in Blue Denim (1959), Take Her, She's Mine (1963, which starred James Stewart), and Shotgun Wedding (also 1963; Maxwell's cinematic swan song, co-written by infamous filmmaker Edward D. Wood, Jr.). In addition to this she appeared in several television shows, including Father Knows Best (1959), The Twilight Zone (1961), Route 66 (1961), Ichabod and Me (1962), The Joey Bishop Show (1962), 77 Sunset Strip (1963) and My Three Sons (1967).

Personal life
On April 17, 1959, the 18-year-old Maxwell married 24-year-old Paul W. Rapp, an assistant director. After separating in December 1961, they had a very public divorce and custody battle over their son Brian, with Maxwell winning after testifying about Rapp's "extremely possessive and overly jealous" nature. The divorce was granted January 29, 1963.

She later married Ervin M. Roeder, a successful attorney who was 21 years her senior, on February 15, 1970 in Los Angeles.

Death
In the afternoon of June 10, 1981, shortly after their separation, Maxwell and Roeder were shot and killed in the lobby of Maxwell's Beverly Hills condo during what was reported at the time as being a botched robbery. She was 39 years old.

The murders supposedly remained unsolved, and the botched robbery story was repeatedly cited in articles about Maxwell. However, in the 2021 book Murder of an Elvis Girl: Solving the Jenny Maxwell Case, author Buddy Moorhouse (a cousin of Maxwell) revealed that the LAPD had concluded at the time that, since no property was taken from the victim(s), the shooting was probably a botched hit on Maxwell, orchestrated by Roeder over pending divorce finances. Roeder (a defence attorney with reputed Mafia connections) had allegedly arranged to receive a survivable wound from the hitman as a diversion, but in the event the wound to his abdomen proved fatal, and Roeder died a few hours after the shooting.

A further irony revealed in the book is that Maxwell's son Brian received absolutely nothing from his late mother's estate, owing to the fact that Roeder had survived his wife by several hours -- because Maxwell died intestate (without a will), all her assets automatically passed to Roeder, and the entire combined estate was in turn inherited by Roeder's daughters from his previous marriage, who refused to give anything to Brian.

See also
List of unsolved murders

References

External links

 
 
 What Really Happened to 1960s Starlet Jenny Maxwell? Detailed article on her life and her murder. 

1941 births
1981 deaths
1981 murders in the United States
20th-century American actresses
American film actresses
American people of Norwegian descent
American television actresses
Deaths by firearm in California
Female murder victims
People murdered in California
Unsolved murders in the United States